Buiter is a surname. Notable people with the surname include:

Harm Buiter (1922–2011), Dutch trade unionist and politician
Willem Buiter (born 1949), Dutch-born American-British economist

See also
Buster (nickname)
Buter